Ya. M. Sverdlov State Owned Enterprise is one of the Russian Federation's strategic manufacturers within its Russian Military Industrial Complex. The plant was founded on 27 June 1916 in the town of Dzerzhinsk (around 30 km from the city of Nizhny Novgorod and 400 km from Moscow).

It is one of the largest Russian manufacturers of industrial explosives, detonators for the oil and gas industry, seismic and geophysical works. The Sverdlov plant employs 5,000 people.

The plant's output is divided into the following:

 Defense applications (30%)
 Explosive products (30%)
 Industrial chemicals (35%)
 Machinery (5%)

Of the aforementioned, Ya. M. Sverdlov Plant is Russia's only producer of HMX and RDX explosive products.

The current CEO of the chemical factory is Yuri F. Shumsky.

References

External links
http://www.sverdlova.ru/
http://www.b2b-center.ru/firms/fkp-zavod-imeni-ia-m-sverdlova/63936/
http://www.osce.org/astana/103181

Defence companies of Russia
Chemical companies of Russia
Government-owned companies of Russia
1916 establishments in the Russian Empire
Companies based in Nizhny Novgorod Oblast
Companies nationalised by the Soviet Union
Chemical companies of the Soviet Union
Defence companies of the Soviet Union